Atma is the sixth studio album by American band YOB. It was released in August 2011 under Profound Lore Records.

Track listing

Personnel
Adapted from AllMusic.

YOB
 Mike Scheidt – vocal, guitars, noise, samples
 Aaron Rieseberg – bass, noise, samples
 Travis Foster – drums, noise, samples

Additional musicians
 Scott Kelly – vocals, percussion
 Jeff Olsen – noise, samples
 Dustin Rieseberg – noise, samples

Production
 Billy Barnett – mastering
 Mike Schiedt – mixing, mastering
 Jeff Olsen – mixing, mastering

Design
 Stevie Floyd – artwork
 Aaron Edge – design, logo, layout

References

2011 albums